Coptodon discolor is a vulnerable species of fish in the cichlid family. It is endemic to Lake Bosumtwi, Bia River Basin, Pra River Basin and Tano River Basin in Ghana and Côte d'Ivoire. It is threatened by pollution and sedimentation from human activities.

References

Freshwater fish of West Africa
discolor
Fish described in 1903
Taxa named by Albert Günther